Elaine Loretta Madsen (née Melson; May 28, 1932) is an American author and filmmaker. She won an Emmy Award in 1983 for producing the documentary Better Than It Has To Be.

Personal life
Madsen was born Elaine Loretta Melson near Romeoville, Illinois. She is divorced from Calvin Christian Madsen, a firefighter, with whom she had two children, actress Virginia Madsen and actor Michael Madsen. She originally embarked on a career in finance, later deciding to pursue more creative endeavors for herself. In the 1960s she became an acquaintance of Roger Ebert, who encouraged her to pursue a career in the film industry. Her grandson is actor Christian Madsen.

Career
In 1983, she produced a documentary titled Better Than It Has To Be, for which she won an Emmy Award. The documentary is about the history of filmmaking in the Chicago area. In 2007, Madsen co-authored with Douglass Stewart a book titled The Texan and the Dutch Gas. Madsen published a book of original poems titled Crayola Can't Make These Colors in 2009. She has written for several magazines and also spent time as a film critic. In 2009, she partnered with her daughter to produce and direct I Know a Woman Like That, a documentary featuring interviews with several women over 60 and how they defy age stereotypes. Featured interviews include Rita Moreno, Lauren Hutton, Elaine Kaufman, and Eartha Kitt. She works with her daughter's film production company, Title IX Productions. The name was chosen from the 1972 law that defends against gender discrimination.

References

External links
 
 Official website

1932 births
Living people
American documentary filmmakers
21st-century American novelists
21st-century American poets
Film producers from Illinois
American women novelists
21st-century American women writers
People from Romeoville, Illinois
American women documentary filmmakers